The Val-Tétreau District (District 4) was a municipal district in the city of Gatineau, Quebec.

The district was located in the Hull sector of the city. The district included the neighbourhoods of Val-Tétreau, Jardins-Alexandre-Taché, Manoir des Trembles, Jardins Mackenzie-King and Plateau.

The district was abolished in 2009, dividing up into Deschênes District, Plateau–Manoir-des-Trembles District and Hull–Val-Tétreau District.

Councillors
Lawrence Cannon (2001-2005)
Alain Pilon (2005-2009)

Election results

2005 

Districts of Gatineau